Hughie Hughes  (c. 1885 – 2 December 1916) was a British racecar driver who participated in the 1911 Indianapolis 500 and the 1912 Indianapolis 500.

Biography
He was killed in an accident on 2 December 1916 at Uniontown Speedway in Uniontown, Pennsylvania. Driver Frank Galvin, with his mechanic Gaston Weigle on board, crashed his car into the stands at about 100 miles an hour. Hughie had just crashed his own car and was talking to a teammate at the side of the track when he was hit.

Indy 500 results

References

1880s births
1916 deaths
Sportspeople from London
English racing drivers
Indianapolis 500 drivers
Racing drivers who died while racing
Sports deaths in Pennsylvania